Mason Andrew Dye (born July 15, 1994) is an American actor known for his roles in Teen Wolf, Flowers in the Attic, and in season four of Stranger Things.

Early life 
Mason Dye was born in Shawnee, Oklahoma. He grew up in Ada, Oklahoma with older brother Preston and younger sister Taylor, who is known for being one half of the country duo Maddie & Tae.

Career 
Dye started his career with supporting roles in movie Adventures of Bailey: A Night in Cowtown and recurring role on web series Secret Diary of an American Cheerleader 2: The Fierce One. In 2014, he starred as Christopher Dollanganger in the Lifetime movie Flowers in the Attic based on the novel by V. C. Andrews. He also guest starred in the TV shows Review and Teen Wolf. In 2015, he played the role of Victor in the Lifetime movie My Stepdaughter. Dye guest starred in Major Crimes and recurred in shows Roommates and Finding Carter. 

In 2016, Dye starred as Tyler Evans in the drama film Natural Selection co-starring Katherine McNamara. Later that year, he starred as Josh Jackson in the action-adventure drama film Vanished – Left Behind: Next Generation alongside Amber Frank and Dylan Sprayberry. In 2017, Dye played the role of Bruce Kane in the Lifetime thriller film Stalker's Prey. He also starred as Tyler Pemhardt in the horror film Truth or Dare, which premiered on syfy channel. In 2018, he starred as Matt in the lifetime movie The Wrong Son.
In 2022, Dye appeared as rich athlete Jason Carver in the fourth season of the Netflix original series Stranger Things.

Filmography

Film

Television

Web

Music videos

References

External links

Living people
American male film actors
21st-century American male actors
Actors from Oklahoma
1994 births
American male television actors